There were two Governments of the 30th Dáil, which was elected at the 2007 general election on 24 May 2007. The 27th Government of Ireland (14 June 2007 – 7 May 2008) was led by Bertie Ahern as Taoiseach, and the 28th Government of Ireland (7 May 2008 – 9 March 2011) was led by Brian Cowen as Taoiseach. Both were formed as coalition governments of Fianna Fáil, the Green Party and the Progressive Democrats. The Progressive Democrats disbanded in November 2009 and Mary Harney continued as an Independent member of the government until 20 January 2011. The Green Party left government on 23 January 2011.

The 27th Government lasted  days and the 28th Government lasted  days.

27th Government of Ireland

The 27th Government of Ireland was composed of Fianna Fáil, the Green Party and the Progressive Democrats. It was also supported by four Independent TDs: Beverley Flynn, Jackie Healy-Rae, Michael Lowry and Finian McGrath. Flynn later rejoined the Fianna Fáil parliamentary party in April 2008.

Nomination of Taoiseach
The 30th Dáil first met on 14 June. In the debate on the nomination of Taoisech, both outgoing Taoiseach and Fianna Fáil leader Bertie Ahern and Fine Gael leader Enda Kenny were proposed. Ahern received the nomination of the Dáil. Ahern was re-appointed as Taoiseach by President Mary McAleese.

Members of the Government
After his appointment by the president, Bertie Ahern proposed the members of the government and they were approved by the Dáil. They were appointed by the president on the same day.

Changes to Departments

Attorney General
On 14 June 2007, Paul Gallagher was appointed by the president as Attorney General on the nomination of the Taoiseach.

Ministers of State
On 14 June 2007, Ahern announced to the Dáil that the Government on his nomination would re-appoint Tom Kitt, TD to the post of Minister for State at the Department of the Taoiseach with special responsibility as Government Chief Whip and Minister of State at the Department of Defence, and would appoint Dick Roche, TD to the position of Minister of State at the Department of Foreign Affairs, with special responsibility for European Affairs. On 20 June 2007, the Taoiseach announced the government had appointed of a further 15 Ministers of State on his nomination, as well as the names of three Ministers of State the government would appoint on his nomination after the passage of the Ministers and Secretaries (Ministers of State) Act 2007. This legislation increased the number of Ministers of State from 17 to 20 and was enacted on 9 July 2007. Kitt and Brendan Smith attended meetings of the cabinet.

Confidence in the Government
On 26 September 2007, a motion of confidence in the Taoiseach and the government proposed by Taoiseach Bertie Ahern was approved with 81 votes in favour and 76 against.

On 28 November 2007, a motion of no confidence in the Minister for Health and Children Mary Harney was proposed by Jan O'Sullivan for the Labour Party. The motion was amended by the Minister, and the amended motion (now a vote of confidence) was carried, with 83 votes in favour to 73 votes against.

Resignation
On 2 April 2008, Bertie Ahern announced his intention to resign as leader of Fianna Fáil. On 9 April, Brian Cowen was elected unopposed to succeed him. On 6 May, Ahern resigned as Taoiseach.

28th Government of Ireland

The 28th Government of Ireland was formed on 7 May 2008 following the resignation the previous day of Bertie Ahern as Taoiseach. The new Fianna Fáil leader Brian Cowen was nominated by the Dáil as Ireland's 12th head of government. It was initially composed of Fianna Fáil, the Green Party, the Progressive Democrats and supported by independent TDs Jackie Healy-Rae, Michael Lowry and Finian McGrath. McGrath later withdrew his support in October 2008.

Following the disbandment of the Progressive Democrats in 2009, it became a coalition of Fianna Fáil, the Green Party and Mary Harney, continuing as an Independent minister.

A cabinet reshuffle took place on 23 March 2010, following the resignations of Willie O'Dea and Martin Cullen. After the resignations of six ministers in January 2011, the vacant portfolios were reassigned to other ministers; with the subsequent resignation of Brian Cowen as leader of Fianna Fáil on 22 January 2011, the Green Party withdrew their support from the government.

The government was dominated by responses to the economic downturn, culminating in a troika of the EU/ECB/IMF troika directing the government's financial decisions in November 2010.

Nomination of Taoiseach
On 7 May 2008, following the resignation of Bertie Ahern as Taoiseach, Fianna Fáil leader Brian Cowen, Fine Gael leader Enda Kenny and Labour Party leader Eamon Gilmore were each proposed to be nominated by Dáil Éireann for the position of Taoiseach. Cowen received the nomination of the Dáil. Cowen was appointed as Taoiseach by President Mary McAleese.

Members of the Government
After his appointment by the president, Brian Cowen proposed the members of the government and they were approved by the Dáil. They were appointed by the president on the same day.

Changes to departments

Attorney General
On 7 May 2008, Paul Gallagher was appointed by the president as Attorney General on the nomination of the Taoiseach.

Ministers of State
On 7 May 2008, Cowen announced that the Government would on his nomination appoint Pat Carey, Barry Andrews, Trevor Sargent, and Dick Roche as Ministers of State. Carey and Andrews would attend meetings of the cabinet. On 13 May 2008, Cowen announced the appointment by the Government on his nomination of 16 further Ministers of State.

Referendums
On 12 June 2008, a referendum was held on the approval of the Treaty of Lisbon. This was defeated, by a margin of 46.6% to 53.4%. On 15 October 2009, a second referendum was held on its approval, which was approved by 67.1% to 32.9%.

Budgets
The Minister for Finance, Brian Lenihan, delivered the following budgets:
 2009 budget, on 14 October 2008
 2009 emergency budget, on 7 April 2009
 2010 Irish budget, on 9 December 2009
 2011 Irish budget, on 7 December 2010

Confidence in the Government
On 10 June 2009, a motion of confidence in the government proposed by Taoiseach Brian Cowen was approved with 85 votes in favour and 79 against.

On 17 February 2010, a motion of confidence in Minister for Defence Willie O'Dea proposed by Taoiseach Brian Cowen was approved with 80 votes in favour and 69 against. Nevertheless, Willie O'Dea did resign the following day.

On 15 June 2010, a motion of confidence in the Taoiseach and the government by Taoiseach Brian Cowen was approved with 82 votes in favour and 77 against.

Dissolution
On 1 February, the president dissolved the Dáil on the advice of the Taoiseach and a general election was held on 25 February 2011.

See also
Constitution of Ireland
Politics of the Republic of Ireland

References

2007 establishments in Ireland
2011 disestablishments in Ireland
30th Dáil
Cabinets established in 2007
Cabinets disestablished in 2011
Coalition governments of Ireland
Governments of Ireland